Hello, Children! is a 1962 Soviet drama film directed by Mark Donskoy.

Plot 
Children from different parts of the world found themselves in a pioneer camp on the Black Sea coast. And suddenly a Japanese girl named Ineko fell ill and other children are doing everything possible to help her. The doctor promised her that she would recover if she made a thousand cranes out of paper.

Cast 
 Aleksei Zharkov
 Pavel Chukhray
 Eduard Izotov
 Lyudmila Skopina

References

External links 
 

1962 films
1960s Russian-language films
Soviet drama films
1962 drama films